David Lanier "Hot Dog" Hollis (born July 4, 1965) is a former American football defensive back who played three seasons, for the Seattle Seahawks and Kansas City Chiefs. He also played in the Canadian Football League for the Las Vegas Posse.

References

1965 births
Seattle Seahawks players
Kansas City Chiefs players
Las Vegas Posse players
American football defensive backs
UNLV Rebels football players
Players of American football from Los Angeles
People from Harbor City, Los Angeles
Living people